Events from the year 2017 in Ukraine.

Incumbents
President: Petro Poroshenko
Prime Minister: Volodymyr Groysman

Events

March
23 March –
Around 20,000 people are evacuated after explosions at a munition depot near Kharkiv.
Murder Denis Voronenkov in Kyiv.

May
 9–13 May – Eurovision Song Contest 2017

Deaths
8 February – Viktor Chanov, Ukrainian footballer (b. 1959)

References

 
2010s in Ukraine
Years of the 21st century in Ukraine
Ukraine
Ukraine